Johnson Hollow is a valley in Oregon County in the U.S. state of Missouri.

Johnson Hollow is named after Gilbert Johnson, an early settler.

References

Valleys of Oregon County, Missouri
Valleys of Missouri